Michael Shabaz (born August 20, 1987) is an Assyrian-American tennis player who won the 2005 Wimbledon boys' doubles championship with Jesse Levine. He is an NCAA tennis player for the University of Virginia Cavaliers.

College career
Shabaz teamed with fellow Cavalier Dominic Inglot to win the 2009 NCAA men's doubles championship. They defeated doubles teams from Pepperdine, Texas Tech, and North Carolina before meeting John Patrick Smith and Davey Sandgren of the University of Tennessee in the finals. Shabaz, then a sophomore, and Inglot, a senior, bested Smith and Sandgren in three sets, 3–6, 7–6(4), 6–4.

Shabaz teamed with fellow Cavalier Drew Courtney to win the 2010 NCAA men's doubles championship for the second year in a row. Again they defeated John Patrick Smith and Davey Sandgren of the University of Tennessee in the finals 6–7(4), 6–2, 6–3.

ATP Challenger and ITF Futures finals

Singles: 8 (4–4)

Doubles: 7 (2–5)

Junior Grand Slam finals

Doubles: 1 (1 title)

References

External links
 
 
 Bio and match history
 College Tennis Online
 Virginia Sports
 

1987 births
Living people
American male tennis players
American people of Iranian descent
American people of Iranian-Assyrian descent
Sportspeople from Fairfax County, Virginia
Tennis people from Virginia
Virginia Cavaliers men's tennis players
Wimbledon junior champions
Grand Slam (tennis) champions in boys' doubles